The Cálraighe were a population-group found mostly in northern Connacht as well as County Westmeath and County Longford. They were purported descendants of Lugaid Cal, son of Daire Sirchrechtaig, who was himself a supposed descendant of Lugaid mac Itha, a first cousin of Míl Espáine.

Daire is stated as having five sons, all called Lugaid, from who each derived the Corcu Loígde, Corco Oirce, Loigis Laigin, Dal Mesen Corb and the Calraige.

Around a dozen branches of the Calraige are listed as inhabitants of northern Connacht. They include:

 Cálraighe Tre Maige of Druim Leas – now Drumlease parish, County Leitrim
 Cálraighe Aelmag – Snedriagail, abbot of Clonmacnoise (died 781), was of this branch
 Cálraighe Locha Gile – possibly an alternative name for the previous
 Cálraighe Droma Cliab – an alternative name for the Cálraighe Locha Gile
 Cálraighe Laithim – location uncertain, possibly near that of Droma Cliab (Drumcliffe, County Sligo)
 Cálraighe Mor – a tuath aithech located with the Lúighne in mid-Sligo
 Cálraighe in Chorainn – aka Cálraighe Morna, found in Corann, Sligo
 Cálraighe Luirg – located south-east of the previous, in Moylurg, County Roscommon
 Cálraighe Culi Cernadan – located in Attymass and Kilgarvan parishes, County Mayo
 Cálraighe Mag nEileag – situated on the north-west corner of Lough Conn, County Mayo
 Cálraighe Mag Muirisc – at the mouth of the river Moy
 Cluain Calraí - located at Clooncolry near Bornacoola, Mohill parish, county Leitrim.
 Druim Chálraighe - located at Drumhalry nearby Carrigallen, in county Leitrim.
 Cnoc Droma Calraí at Knock parish, County Mayo.
 an unattested branch at Glencalry, Doonfeeny, County Mayo

Cálraighe found outside Connacht included the following:

 Cálraighe Bri Leith – found in County Longford
 Cálraighe in Chalaid – in the parish of Ballyloughloe, County Westmeath
 Cálraighe Bregmuine – barony of Brawny, County Westmeath
 Cálraighe Tethba – somewhere in County Longford

References

 Lugaid Cal and the Calraige, Donnchad Ó Corrain, Eigse 13, 1970
 Some Connacht Population Groups, Nollaig Ó Muraíle, in Seanchas:Studies in Early and Medieval Irish Archaeology, History and Literature in Honour of Francis John Byrne, pp. 162–65. Four Courts Press, Dublin, 2000.

Secondary references

Ethnic groups in Ireland
Gaelic-Irish nations and dynasties
History of County Sligo
History of County Mayo
History of County Longford
History of County Westmeath
History of County Roscommon